A lawyers bodkin or ribbon threader is a tool used in work with stationery.  It is used to bore holes in paper documents so that a connector such as legal tape, a treasury tag or a brass fastener can be threaded through the hole in the documents to bind them together.  A lawyers bodkin is similar to a stitching awl: it consists of a pointed metal shaft with an eyelet near the pointed end connected to a bulb-shaped wooden handle; the shaft is kept attached to the handle by a ferrule.

References

External links
 Description of typical use of a lawyers bodkin from Pelikan website

Stationery
Fasteners